This is a list of electoral results for the electoral district of Dawesville in Western Australian state elections.

Members for Dawesville

Election results

Elections in the 2020s

Elections in the 2010s

Elections in the 2000s

Elections in the 1990s

References

Western Australian state electoral results by district